A constitutional referendum was held in Niger on 12 May 1996. The new constitution would restore multi-party democracy after the military coup earlier in the year had ousted elected President Mahamane Ousmane.

It was approved by 92.34% of voters with a turnout of only around 35%. The first presidential elections under the new constitution were held on 7 and 8 July, and saw a victory for coup leader Ibrahim Baré Maïnassara.

Results

References

1996 referendums
1996 in Niger
1996
Constitutional referendums in Niger
1996